The Yongheshan Reservoir is a reservoir in Sanwan Township, Miaoli County, Taiwan.

History
The dam was constructed starting in July 1980 and completed in October 1984.

Architecture
The water level of the reservoir stands at a height of 89.5 meters. The reservoir features automatic overflow side spillway. The reservoir has an effective capacity of 28,096,000 m3.

Function
The reservoir supplies water to public sectors for about 187,000 m3 per day.

See also
 Geography of Taiwan

References

1984 establishments in Taiwan
Dams completed in 1984
Landforms of Miaoli County
Reservoirs in Taiwan
Sanwan Township